Dear Catastrophe Waitress is the sixth studio album by Scottish indie pop band Belle & Sebastian, released on 6 October 2003 on Rough Trade Records. Producer Trevor Horn, former member of the Buggles and producer of groups like Yes and Frankie Goes to Hollywood, oversaw the production of the album, and gave it a more polished, pop-friendly sound, which stood in sharp contrast with their previous lo-fi, folky albums (although songs like "Lord Anthony" hearkened back to their old sound). In particular, the danceable track "Stay Loose" proved to be the first in a series of songs (such as "Your Cover's Blown" and "Sukie in the Graveyard") that further diverged from their roots.

"Stay Loose" was released to radio on 24 February 2004. The album was nominated for the 2004 Mercury Music Prize, while the song "Step into My Office, Baby" was shortlisted for an Ivor Novello Award in the Best Song category.

As of 2007, Dear Catastrophe Waitress had sold 138,000 units in the US.

Track listing

Charts

References

External links
 Dear Catastrophe Waitress listing on the band's official site, with credits, liner notes, and links to lyrics.

2003 albums
Belle and Sebastian albums
Albums produced by Trevor Horn